Epilobium anagallidifolium is a species of willowherb known by the common names pimpernel willowherb and alpine willowherb. This small flowering plant has a near-circumboreal distribution and can be found in mountain ranges further south, where grows in alpine climates. It is a perennial found in low clumps rarely exceeding 20 centimeters in height.

Description
This species has an unbranched stem rising to 150 cm high. The leaves are lanceolate, alternate and have a short stalk.
It has wide, rounded basal leaves and narrower leaves further up the stem, and its foliage is often hairy. It bears purple or pinkish trumpet-shaped flowers and the fruit is a capsule two or three centimeters long.

References

External links

Jepson Manual Treatment
Photo gallery

anagallidifolium